Lữ Anh Tuấn (born 4 October 1947) stage name Tuấn Ngọc is a Vietnamese singer. His first album appeared in 1990 and over the following 20 years, he has released 20 more albums, becoming one of the most recognised singers on Vietnamese TV.

Biography
Tuấn Ngọc was born in Da Lat, Vietnam; in an artistic-traditioned family. His siblings are all well-known singers in Vietnam during the 1990s, including singer Khánh Hà (1952). He start singing at the age of 4, when he sang in children's radio programs. At the age of 13, he followed older artists to sing at American clubs during its sparse period in Saigon.

By the end of 1960s, when the movement of young music flourished, Tuấn Ngọc began performing English songs, from which he gained popularity. By the early 1970s, he participated in the two biggest bands at that time, The Strawberry Four and The Top Five.

After 1975, Tuấn Ngọc left his home country and settled in Southern California. Some time later he moved to Hawaii and performed for many clubs and hotels here. By the mid-1980s he returned to California and began to succeed. In 1994, he married oversea singer Thái Thảo.

Tuấn Ngọc is famous for his lyrical songs. Throughout his career, he has gained appreciation from the professionals as well as the admiration of the music-loving public Trịnh Công Sơn considers Tuấn Ngọc as the best male vocalist among artists singing his songs. In the 2000s, he is considered by many people as a "monumental" male vocalist of Vietnamese new music. Many singers from later generations have cited him as an influence, including Quang Dũng, Trần Thái Hòa.

He recently returned to Vietnam to perform periodically and recorded two albums: "Hãy Yêu Nhau Đi 2" and "Chiều nay không có em". His first official concert took place in early April 2006 at Sheraton Saigon Hotel with about 500 audiences. In 2013, his liveshow In the Spotlight Program No. 1: Private Corner took place over three nights at Hanoi Opera House.

In 2019, he became a coach in The Voice of Vietnam.

Discography

 Lời Gọi Chân Mây (Diễm Xưa), 1989
 Chuyện tình buồn (Làng Văn CD 15), 1990
 Thương ai (Mai Productions), 1992, with Ý Lan
 Môi nào hãy còn thơm (Diễm xưa CD 57), 1993, with Trịnh Vĩnh Trinh
 Giọt lệ cho ngàn sau, a collection of love songs by Từ Công Phụng (1994)
 Ngày đó chúng mình / Tình ca Phạm Duy (Khánh Hà CD 21), with Khánh Hà
 Em ngủ trong một mùa đông (Diễm xưa CD 62), a collection of love songs by Đăng Khánh
 Rong rêu
 Mưa trên vùng tóc rối, 1999, a collection of love songs by Lê Xuân Trường
 Lối về (Bích Thu Vân CD 1), with Cẩm Vân
 Em đi như chiều đi (Bích Thu Vân CD 2)
 Đừng bỏ em một mình (Bích Thu Vân CD 3), with Ý Lan
 Đêm thấy ta là thác đổ (Bích Thu Vân CD 4), 15 love songs by Trịnh Công Sơn
 Lá đổ muôn chiều
 Phôi pha
 Riêng một góc trời
 Tâm sự gởi về đâu
 Hoài cảm, with Thái Hiền
 Tình yêu, with Thanh Hà
 Đi giữa mọi người để nhớ một người, 2001
 Dù nghìn năm qua đi
 Bến lỡ, với Ý Lan, a collection of love songs by Hoàng Ngọc Ẩn
 Lời yêu thương, with Ý Lan
 Sao đổi ngôi, 2002, tình khúc Bảo Trường, with Ý Lan
 Collection Và tôi mãi yêu em – Trên bờ môi dấu yêu (Asia CD 172 : The best of Tuấn Ngọc, 4 CD), 2002
 Hãy yêu nhau đi Vol. 2, 2005
 Tình cuốn mây ngàn, 2005, with Quang Dũng
 Chiều nay không có em
Riêng Một Góc Trời, TNCD611 (2019)

References

External links
Tuấn Ngọc Official Website  Tuấn Ngọc Productions.
Tuấn Ngọc .
 Tuan Ngoc on Doligo Music.

20th-century Vietnamese male singers
1947 births
Living people
People from Da Lat
Vietnamese Roman Catholics
Vietnamese emigrants to the United States
21st-century Vietnamese male singers